Upper Madawaska River Provincial Park is a waterway-class provincial park on the Madawaska River in the municipality of South Algonquin in Nipissing District, Ontario, Canada. The park consists of a strip of land along both shores of the Madawaska River from the communities of Whitney to Madawaska. It is upstream and north of (and not contiguous with) the Lower Madawaska River Provincial Park.

As a non-operating park, it offers neither facilities nor services. Its most popular use is for whitewater kayaking and canoeing. A rail corridor along the river that was originally built for the now-abandoned Ottawa, Arnprior and Parry Sound Railway has been incorporated into the park in the form of a rail trail.

See also
List of Ontario parks

References

External links

Provincial parks of Ontario
Rail trails in Ontario
Parks in Nipissing District

Year of establishment missing